Gibraltar is a city in Wayne County in the U.S. state of Michigan. The population was 4,656 at the 2010 census.

The city is bordered by the Detroit River to the east, the city of Trenton to the north, and the township of Brownstown to the south and west.

History
Gibraltar was first settled as early as 1811 and later platted on March 14, 1837, by trustees of the Gibralter & Flat Rock Company.  The community received its first post office under the name "Gibralter" on October 2, 1837.  The post office was renamed to Woodbury on December 8, 1838, but renamed back to Gibralter on May 13, 1839.  The spelling was changed to "Gibraltar" on December 19, 1900, until it was discontinued entirely on January 31, 1910.  The community of Gibraltar was originally part of Brownstown Township.  It incorporated as a village 1954 and gain autonomy when it became a city in 1961.

Geography

Demographics

2010 census
As of the census of 2010, there were 4,656 people, 1,946 households, and 1,283 families living in the city. The racial makeup of the city was 94.7% White, 2.0% African American, 0.4% Native American, 0.7% Asian, 0.1% Pacific Islander, 0.6% from other races, and 1.6% from two or more races. Hispanic or Latino of any race were 2.9% of the population.

There were 1,946 households, of which 29.2% had children under the age of 18 living with them, 48.2% were married couples living together, 12.4% had a female householder with no husband present, 5.3% had a male householder with no wife present, and 34.1% were non-families. 27.8% of all households were made up of individuals, and 10% had someone living alone who was 65 years of age or older. The average household size was 2.39 and the average family size was 2.92.

The median age in the city was 41.4 years. 22% of residents were under the age of 18; 7.8% were between the ages of 18 and 24; 24.9% were from 25 to 44; 31.1% were from 45 to 64; and 14.2% were 65 years of age or older. The gender makeup of the city was 49.9% male and 50.1% female.

2000 census
As of the census of 2000, there were 4,264 people, 1,728 households, and 1,225 families living in the city. The racial makeup of the city was 96.74% White, 0.52% African American, 0.33% Native American, 0.40% Asian, 0.59% from other races, and 1.43% from two or more races. Hispanic or Latino of any race were 1.83% of the population.

There were 1,728 households, out of which 31.3% had children under the age of 18 living with them, 56.0% were married couples living together, 10.1% had a female householder with no husband present, and 29.1% were non-families. 23.3% of all households were made up of individuals, and 5.5% had someone living alone who was 65 years of age or older. The average household size was 2.46 and the average family size was 2.89.

In the city, 23.5% of the population was under the age of 18, 7.9% from 18 to 24, 31.5% from 25 to 44, 28.2% from 45 to 64, and 8.9% who were 65 years of age or older.  The median age was 38 years. For every 100 females, there were 101.7 males.  For every 100 females age 18 and over, there were 100.1 males.

The median income for a household in the city was $58,167, and the median income for a family was $67,457. Males had a median income of $53,750 versus $31,708 for females. The per capita income for the city was $28,528. About 1.9% of families and 2.7% of the population were below the poverty line, including 1.3% of those under age 18 and 3.2% of those age 65 or over.

Education
Public education is provided by the Gibraltar School District, serving all of Gibraltar, all of Rockwood, portions of Woodhaven, and portions of Brownstown Township. The school district operates these schools in Gibraltar:
Parsons Elementary School 
Shumate Middle School 
Carlson High School

References

External links

City of Gibraltar official website

Cities in Wayne County, Michigan
Michigan populated places on the Detroit River
Metro Detroit
Populated places established in 1811
1811 establishments in Michigan Territory